List of the works of the Maître de Thégonnec.

This is a listing/"catalogue raisonnė" of the works of the Maître de Thégonnec. He is best known for his work on the Calvary at Saint-Thégonnec. Here he was responsible for all the statuary except Roland Doré (sculptor)'s "Christ aux outrages". He operated between the years 1550 and 1610. Apart from the grand calvary at Saint-Thégonnec, he worked on another calvary for Saint-Ségal's Saint-Sébastien chapel and a smaller calvary at Locquénolé, near Morlaix. He also added finishing touches to the Calvary at Guimiliau. These apart, the remains of calvaries at Guimiliiau, Saint-Thégonnec, La Roche-Maurice, Lochmélar, Plougastel-Daoulas and Bourg-Blanc show how active the Maître de Thégonnec and his workshop were! He also completed statues for the fountains at Pleyben and Ploudaniel.

Calvaries

Fountains

Further reading
"Sculpteurs sur pierre en Basse-Bretagne. Les Ateliers du XVe au XVIIe Siècle" by Emmanuelle LeSeac'h. Published by Presses Universitaires de Rennes.

References

Calvaries in Brittany
Buildings and structures in Finistère